Rich Man, Poor Girl is a 1938 American comedy film directed by Reinhold Schünzel and starring Robert Young, Ruth Hussey and Lew Ayres. The film is a remake of the 1929 film The Idle Rich. This was Lana Turner's second appearance as an MGM star.

Plot summary

The wealthy young businessman Bill Harrison (Robert Young) moves in with secretary girlfriend Joan Thayer's (Ruth Hussey) eccentric family to convince her they can make their marriage work.

Cast
 Robert Young as Bill Harrison
 Lew Ayres as Henry Thayer
 Ruth Hussey as Joan Thayer
 Lana Turner as Helen
 Rita Johnson as Sally Harrison
 Don Castle as Frank
 Guy Kibbee as Pa
 Sarah Padden as Ma
 Gordon Jones as Tom Grogan
 Virginia Grey as Miss Selma Willis
 Marie Blake as Mrs. Gussler

Box office
According to MGM records the film earned $340,000 in the US and Canada and $158,000 elsewhere resulting in a profit of $240,000.

References

External links 
 
 
 
 

1938 films
American black-and-white films
1938 comedy films
American comedy films
Films about interclass romance
Films directed by Reinhold Schünzel
1930s English-language films
1930s American films